Maattoly is a 1978 Indian Malayalam-language film directed by A. Bhimsingh and starring M. G. Soman, Sharada, Sukumari, Jayabharathi, and Jagannatha Varma. It is a remake of the 1972 Hindi film Dushmun. The film was released on 25 April 1978.

Plot 

Raghu, an alcoholic truck driver, accidentally kills a man while driving. Despite having an opportunity to escape, he decides to surrender. The judge Joseph, instead of sending Raghu to prison, assigns him to support the deceased man's family for two years.

Cast 
Sarada as Malathi
Sukumari as Kochammini
Jayabharathi as Radha
Jagannatha Varma as Judge
Jalaja as Thankam
K. P. A. C. Sunny as Joseph
M. G. Soman as Raghu
Jagathy Sreekumar as Keshavan
Jose Prakash as Sekharan
Philomina as Kalyani
Nellikode Bhaskaran as Govindan
Pattom Sadan as Constable Narayana Pilla

Soundtrack 
The music was composed by Jaya Vijaya and the lyrics were written by Bichu Thirumala.

References

External links 
 

1978 films
1970s Malayalam-language films
Films directed by A. Bhimsingh
Malayalam remakes of Hindi films
Films scored by Jaya Vijaya